Dharanidhar University, formally Dharanidhar Autonomous College, is a state public university in the district of Keonjhar in the Indian state of Odisha.

The college was established in 1957 as Keonjhar Science College an intermediate science college and was granted affiliation by Utkal University. It was initially headed by R. Venkatraman, IAS. On February 12, 2023, the college was got  University status.

History 
Funding for the main building of the college was donated by Muhammad Shrajuddin. The college was taken over by the Government of Odisha in 1962. On the opening of the college's humanities courses in 1967, it was renamed after Keonjhar College. It introduced an Hons at the B.Sc. level in 1974. 

During 1983–84, the institution was renamed after the revolutionary Dharanidhar Naik.

In 1999 the college affiliated with North Odisha University, at Baripada, in the adjoining district of Mayurbhanj.

Autonomous status was conferred to the college on 24 September 2004. It was accredited B++ by the National Assessment and Accreditation Council (NAAC) on 2 February 2006. The College was got University status on 12 Feb. 2023.

Students 
The college enrolls about 2300 undergraduates. It is the second-largest college in Odisha by accordance area.

Facilities 
The college is equipped with laboratories, a central library, audio-visual labs and a playground.

Academics
Undergraduate courses include anthropology, botany, chemistry, commerce, computer science, English, economics,  geology, history, mathematics, philosophy, physics, political science, and zoology as well as Odia and Sanskrit.

References

 Department of Higher Education, Odisha
 Universities and colleges in Odisha
 Kendujhar district
1957 establishments in Orissa
Educational institutions established in 1957